Colorado's 26th Senate district is one of 35 districts in the Colorado Senate. It has been represented by Democrat Jeff Bridges since 2019, following the resignation of fellow Democrat Daniel Kagan.

Geography
District 26 covers many of Denver's immediate southern suburbs in Arapahoe County, including Cherry Hills Village, Englewood, Greenwood Village, Sheridan, Columbine Valley, most of Littleton, and a small part of western Aurora.

The district is split between Colorado's 1st and 6th congressional districts, and overlaps with the 3rd, 38th, 40th, and 41st districts of the Colorado House of Representatives.

Recent election results
Colorado state senators are elected to staggered four-year terms; under normal circumstances, the 26th district holds elections in presidential years.

2020
In December 2018, Senator Daniel Kagan announced he would resign following odd allegations that he had repeatedly used a women's bathroom in the state capitol. State Rep. Jeff Bridges was appointed to replace him in January 2019 and won a full term in 2020.

2016

2012

Federal and statewide results in District 26

References 

26
Arapahoe County, Colorado